The 2020 season was Aalesund's first season back in Eliteserien since their relegation at the end of the 2017 season. They finished the season bottom of the league and where relegated back to the 1. divisjon at the first opportunity.

Season events
On 12 June, the Norwegian Football Federation announced that a maximum of 200 home fans would be allowed to attend the upcoming seasons matches.

On 10 September, the Norwegian Football Federation cancelled the 2020 Norwegian Cup due to the COVID-19 pandemic in Norway.

On 30 September, the Minister of Culture and Gender Equality, Abid Raja, announced that clubs would be able to have crowds of 600 at games from 12 October.

Squad

Out on loan

Transfers

In

Loans in

Out

Loans out

Released

Friendlies

Competitions

Eliteserien

Results summary

Results by round

Results

Table

Norwegian Cup

Squad statistics

Appearances and goals

|-
|colspan="14"|Players away from Aalesund on loan:

|-
|colspan="14"|Players who left Aalesund during the season

|}

Goal scorers

Clean sheets

Disciplinary record

References

External links
 Official website
 Stormen Fanclub Site

Aalesunds
Aalesunds FK seasons